Psoroglaena stigonemoides is a species of corticolous (bark-dwelling) lichen in the family Verrucariaceae. It occurs in Great Britain and Ireland. It was first described scientifically by lichenologist Alan Orange in 1989, as Macentina stigonemoides. He collected the type specimen from Cardiganshire, Cambria, where it was found growing on the bark of Ulmus glabra in a humid forest. Aino Henssen transferred it to the genus Psoroglaena in 1995.

The pale green, filamentous thallus of Psoroglaena stigonemoides is epiphloedal, meaning it is on the surface of the bark, with little or no penetration below the outermost layer. It has perithecioid ascomata measuring 200–340 μm wide and up to 420 μm high. Its asci are eight-spored and measure 80–90 μm by 9–12 μm long.

References

Verrucariales
Lichen species
Lichens described in 1989
Lichens of Northern Europe
Taxa named by Alan Orange